E-4WD is a system used by Nissan that drives two rear wheels with an electric motor to supplement the traction available to a front wheel drive vehicle. This avoids the complication of installing a drive shaft to transfer power to the rear wheels. It also increases efficiency as when additional traction is not needed the rear wheels can be completely disengaged from the drive train.  The system was developed by Hitachi.

Vehicles

Nissan 
March/Micra (3, 4 generations)
Cube (2,3 second generation)
Cube Cubic
Tiida
Tiida Latio (only first)
Note
Bluebird Sylphy (only second generation)
Wingroad (third generation)

Mazda 
Demio (2,3 second generation)
Verisa

See also 
:ja:E-4WD

References 

Nissan